Radi Nedelchev (born April 1, 1938) is a Bulgarian artist best known as a painter of naïve art. His paintings depict mostly landscapes, village life and festivals.

Radi Nedelchev is a member of the Union of Bulgarian Artists and also holds The Order of Cyril and Methodius 1st class – the highest prize for art and culture in Bulgaria

References

External links 
  Works by Radi Nedelechev
 A documentary about the artist
 Bridgeman Art Library

1938 births
Living people
Landscape artists
Modern painters
Naïve painters
Bulgarian painters
People from Razgrad Province